Roy C. Smelker (March 7, 1875 – August 13, 1959) was a member of the Wisconsin State Assembly.

Biography
Smelker was born on March 7, 1875, in Iowa County, Wisconsin. He graduated from high school in Dodgeville, Wisconsin in 1892 and from what is now the University of Wisconsin–Madison in 1897. During the Spanish–American War, he served in the United States Army. Afterwards, he graduated from the University of Wisconsin Law School in 1899 and operated a law firm with his father.

Political career
Smelker was a member of the Wisconsin Assembly during the 1903 and 1905 sessions. He was a Republican. He later relocated to Minnesota, where he was the first secretary of the Minnesota Farmer–Labor Party.

References

External links

People from Dodgeville, Wisconsin
Republican Party members of the Wisconsin State Assembly
Military personnel from Wisconsin
United States Army soldiers
American military personnel of the Spanish–American War
Wisconsin lawyers
University of Wisconsin–Madison alumni
University of Wisconsin Law School alumni
1875 births
1959 deaths